Lestes auripennis is a species of spreadwing in the damselfly family Lestidae.

The IUCN conservation status of Lestes auripennis is "EN", endangered. The species faces a high risk of extinction in the near future. The IUCN status was reviewed in 2017.

References

Further reading

 

Lestes
Articles created by Qbugbot
Insects described in 1955